is a Japanese professional shogi player ranked 8-dan. He is a former executive director of the Japan Shogi Association.

Shogi professional

Promotion history
Satō's promotion history is as follows:
 6-kyū: 1980
 1-dan: 1983 
 4-dan: October 1, 1990
 5-dan: October 11, 1994
 6-dan: July 9, 1999
 7-dan: December 10, 2007
 8-dan: July 31, 2020

Titles and other championships
Satō has yet to appear in a major title match, but he has won one non-major title championship.

JSA director
Satō is a former member of the Japan Shogi Association's board of directors. He was elected to be an  executive director for a two-year term at the association's the 66th General Meeting in June 2015.

References

External links
ShogiHub: Professional Player Info · Sato, Shuji

Japanese shogi players
Living people
Professional shogi players
Professional shogi players from Miyagi Prefecture
1967 births
Shinjin-Ō